Diglyme, or bis(2-methoxyethyl) ether, is a solvent with a high boiling point.  It is an organic compound which is the dimethyl ether of diethylene glycol. (The name diglyme is a portmanteau of diglycol methyl ether.) It is a colorless liquid with a slight ether-like odor. It is miscible with water as well as organic solvents.

It is prepared by a reaction of dimethyl ether and ethylene oxide over an acid catalyst.

Solvent

Because of its resistance to strong bases, diglyme is favored as a solvent for reactions of alkali metal reagents even at high temperatures. Rate enhancements in reactions involving organometallic reagents, such as Grignard reactions or metal hydride reductions, have been observed when using diglyme as a solvent.

Diglyme is also used as a solvent in hydroboration reactions with diborane.

It serves as a chelate for alkali metal cations, leaving anions more active.

Safety
The European Chemicals Agency lists diglyme as a Substances of Very High Concern (SVHC) as a Reproductive Toxin.

At higher temperatures and in the presence of active metals diglyme is known to decompose, which can produce large amounts of gas and heat. This decomposition led to the T2 Laboratories reactor explosion in 2007.

References

Glycol ethers
Chelating agents